Dipeptidase E (aspartyl dipeptidase, peptidase E, PepE gene product (Salmonella typhimurium)) is an enzyme. This enzyme catalyses the following chemical reaction

 Dipeptidase E catalyses the hydrolysis of dipeptides Asp!Xaa. It does not act on peptides with N-terminal Glu, Asn or Gln, nor does it cleave isoaspartyl peptides

A free carboxy group is not absolutely required in the substrate.

References

External links 
 

EC 3.4.13